Sarfaraz Ahmad is an Indian politician from Jharkhand. Ahmad is a member of the Jharkhand Mukti Morcha. He is a member of the Jharkhand Legislative Assembly. He represented Gandey constituency in 1980 and 2009 as INC MLA and in 2019 as JMM MLA.

References 

People from Giridih district
Bihar MLAs 1980–1985
Jharkhand MLAs 2009–2014
Jharkhand MLAs 2019–2024
Indian National Congress politicians from Bihar
Indian National Congress politicians from Jharkhand
Jharkhand Mukti Morcha politicians

Living people
Year of birth missing (living people)